Folk Art Found Me is a Canadian documentary film, directed by Alex Busby and released in 1993. The film is a portrait of folk artists in Nova Scotia.

The film premiered at the 1993 Atlantic Film Festival, where it won the award for Best Atlantic Documentary. It received a Genie Award nomination for Best Documentary at the 15th Genie Awards in 1994, and was co-winner with Frédéric Back's The Mighty River of the Golden Sheaf Award for Best of Festival at the 1994 Yorkton Film Festival.

References

External links
 

1993 films
1993 documentary films
Canadian documentary films
Films shot in Nova Scotia
National Film Board of Canada documentaries
1990s English-language films
1990s Canadian films